Matthias Kreutzer (born 23 December 1982) is a German football coach. he the currently assistant head coach Bundesliga club of  Schalke 04.

Career
On 20 October 2022, Kreutzer took over Schalke 04 as head coach on an interim basis after Frank Kramer was sacked by the club. His tenure was over after a week, when a new coach, Thomas Reis, was hired

References

German sports coaches
Living people
Bundesliga managers
FC Schalke 04 managers
1982 births
Hamburger SV non-playing staff
Sportspeople from Erfurt
Footballers from Thuringia